Decimation Blues is the sixth and final studio album by American folk band Castanets. It was released on August 19, 2014, through Asthmatic Kitty.  It would be the last release before their disbandment in 2022 due to lead singer Raymond Raposa's death.

Reception

Decimation Blues received mixed to positive reviews from critics. On Metacritic, the album holds a score of 68/100 based on 9 reviews.

Track list
(All songs by Raymond Raposa)

References

2014 albums
Castanets (band) albums
Asthmatic Kitty albums